Woodrow Wilson Williams (August 23, 1918 – May 22, 1990) was an American Negro league pitcher in the 1940s.

A native of Nolensville, Tennessee, Williams played for the Washington Elite Giants in 1937 and played with the team after it moved to  Baltimore in 1938 and 1940. In 21 recorded appearances on the mound, he posted a 5–3 record with a 5.04 ERA over 69.2 innings. Williams died in Chicago, Illinois in 1990 at age 71.

References

External links
 and Seamheads

1918 births
1990 deaths
Baltimore Elite Giants players
Washington Elite Giants players
Baseball pitchers
Baseball players from Nashville, Tennessee
20th-century African-American sportspeople